Seyfullah Sağır (born 16 March 1998), better known as Sefo, is a Turkish rapper and songwriter. He rose to fame in Turkey with his song "Bilmem mi?", which features reggaeton elements.

Life and career
Seyfullah Sağır was born on 16 March 1998 in Samsun.

In March 2018, he released his first single "Yalan". In February 2019, and with the success of his second single "Poz" he decided to pursue a professional career in music. On 18 April 2019, he released the single "Up Down", followed by "362" in June 2019. The majority of his songs feature pop elements as well.

On 21 February 2020, he released the song "Başa Sar", featuring Aerro and Yase. Other singles include "Ardından", "YOUNGSTAR", "İhtiyacım Yok", "Liman", "Toz Duman", "Bonita (ft. Reynmen)", and "Bilmem mi?", the last of which topped the music charts in Turkey.

In June 2022, he was controversially removed from stage during his concert in Bodrum, Turkey by officials acting on behalf of the district governor’s office. The reason was a Coronavirus pandemic restriction still in place that forbade musical events lasting past 1 AM. However, what outraged Sefo and his fans was that the forceful removal happened  at 12:30 AM, for unclear reasons.

Discography

Singles

 Yalan (2018)
 Poz (2019)
 Up Down (2019)
 362 (2019)
 Derdi Ne?  (2019)
 Başa Sar (ft. Aerro, Yase)  (2020)
 Rest (2020)
 Kaybol (ft. Revart) (2020)
 Nerdeyim?  (2020)
 Geri Gel (2020)
 Ardından (2021)
 YOUNGSTAR (2021)
 İhtiyacım Yok (2021) 
 Liman (2021)
 Toz Duman (2021)
 Bonita (ft. Reynmen) (2021)
 Bilmem mi? (2021)
 Affettim (2022)
 Mírame (Bilmem mi? Remix) (ft. Reik) (2022)
 Yarım Kalır (ft. Revart) (2022)
 Tutsak (2022)
 Isabelle (ft. CAPO) (2022)
 Kördüğüm (ft. Jako) (2022)
 Şahane (ft. Organize) (2022)
 Gitti (ft. Aerro) (2022)
 Beni Beni (2022)

Charts

References

External links 
 
 
 

1998 births
Living people
Trap musicians
Turkish lyricists
Turkish rappers